Chełm i Gdańsk Południe ( und Danzig Süden) has been an administrative district (dzielnica administracyjna) of the city of Gdańsk, Poland.

Between 2010 an 2019 it was divided in the districts of:
 Chełm
 Jasień
 Orunia Górna-Gdańsk Południe
 Ujeścisko-Łostowice

References

External links
 gedanopedia.pl: Chełm (Polish)

Gdańsk